Eccleston may refer to:

Places in England
Eccleston, Cheshire
Eccleston, Lancashire
Eccleston Quarry
Eccleston, St Helens, Merseyside (historically in Lancashire)

People
Charles H. Eccleston (active from 2001), American environmentalist
Christopher Eccleston (born 1964), English actor
Inez Maria Eccleston, birthname of Inez M. Haring (1875–1968), US botanist
John Eccleston, British puppeteer
Joseph Eccleston (1754–1811), American planter, soldier, and politician
Nathan Eccleston (born 1990), English footballer
Samuel Eccleston (1801–1851), American archbishop
Thomas of Eccleston, thirteenth century English Franciscan chronicler
Tom Eccleston (1910–2000), American ice hockey coach
Tommy Eccleston (1875–1946), English footballer

See also
Great Eccleston, Lancashire
Little Eccleston-with-Larbreck, Lancashire
Ecclestone (surname)
Eggleston